Elmer Scipio Dundy (March 5, 1830 – October 28, 1896) was a United States district judge of the United States District Court for the District of Nebraska. He was the namesake of Dundy County, Nebraska.

Biography 

Born on March 5, 1830, in Trumbull County, Ohio, Dundy read law in 1853. He entered private practice in Clearfield, Pennsylvania, and Falls City, Nebraska Territory (unorganized territory until May 30, 1854) from 1853 to 1858. He was a member of the Council of the Territory of Nebraska from 1858 to 1862. In June, 1861 Elmer Dundy married Ohio native Mary H. Robison and they had a son a year later, Elmer Scipio Dundy Jr., followed by 3 daughters: Mary Mae, Luna, and Enid Alva (died at one year of age). He resumed private practice in Falls City from 1862 to 1863. He was a Judge of the United States District Court for the District of Nebraska Territory from 1863 to 1868.

Federal judicial service 

Following the admission of the State of Nebraska to the Union on March 1, 1867, Dundy was nominated by President Andrew Johnson on April 4, 1868, to the United States District Court for the District of Nebraska, to a new seat authorized by 15 Stat. 5. He was confirmed by the United States Senate on April 9, 1868, and received his commission the same day. His service terminated on October 28, 1896, due to his death in Omaha, Nebraska, at which time Dundy was the longest-serving judge appointed by Johnson.

Notable cases 

On May 12, 1879, Dundy ruled in the case Standing Bear v. Crook that Standing Bear and other Ponca were "people" who able to bring petitions for habeas corpus, and that Indians who had severed their relationships with their tribes could not be ordered to a reservation against their will. The next year, Dundy was part of the lower court panel that heard Elk v. Wilkins, which asserted that Indians who had left their tribes and submitted to the jurisdiction of the United States were American citizens. In 1884, the United States Supreme Court rejected Elk's petition, holding that Indians born in tribal relations in the United States could only become citizens under specific federal laws. It was not until 1924 that all Indians born in the United States were declared citizens with the passing of the Indian Citizenship Act of 1924.

Dundy County 

Dundy was the namesake of Dundy County, Nebraska.

"Skip" Dundy 
Dundy's son, Elmer Scipio Dundy Jr., better known as "Skip" Dundy, was born in Falls City, Nebraska in 1862. Skip Dundy grew up to become a promoter on Coney Island, due to in part the stories told by Buffalo Bill Cody who was a familiar visitor in the Dundy home.

References

Sources

External links 
 

1830 births
1896 deaths
Nebraska state court judges
Judges of the United States District Court for the District of Nebraska
United States federal judges appointed by Andrew Johnson
19th-century American judges
People from Trumbull County, Ohio
Dundy County, Nebraska